Saint-Léonard is a commune in the Seine-Maritime department in the Normandy region in northern France.

Geography
The commune is just south of Fécamp and comprises the village itself and several hamlets. The coast faces the English Channel.

Population

Places of interest
 The ruins of the thirteenth-century Hogues castle.
 The church of St. Leonard, dating from the eleventh century.

See also
Communes of the Seine-Maritime department

References

Communes of Seine-Maritime